Edder Alfonso Pérez Consuegra (born 3 July 1983) is a football player from San Felipe, Venezuela who plays as a defender.

Club career
Pérez is a versatile player, able to play in any position on the left flank as well as a center midfielder. Started his career at Caracas FC where he quickly made the defence his home and was a fan favourite at the club following his impressive performances in Copa Libertadores, specially against Brazilian outfit Santos. After only one season at the club he joined BWINLIGA club CS Maritimo on loan from Caracas, who did not want to sell the talisman of the squad so they loaned him out to the club with Maritimo having the option of signing him.

International career
The full back, Venezuelan international, was selected as part of Venezuela's squad for the 2007 Copa América tournament, which was held in his home country.

Pérez played a major role in the attack in his first game in the 2007 Copa América as his country ran out 2–0 winners against Peru.

References

External links

1983 births
Living people
Venezuelan footballers
Venezuela international footballers
2007 Copa América players
Caracas FC players
C.S. Marítimo players
Yaracuyanos FC players
Portuguesa F.C. players
Venezuelan expatriate footballers
Expatriate footballers in Portugal
Primeira Liga players
Association football defenders
Venezuelan expatriate sportspeople in Portugal
People from San Felipe, Venezuela